Alisha Foote (born 1 May 1991) is an Australian football (soccer) player, who last played for Brisbane Roar in the Australian W-League.

References

1991 births
Living people
Australian women's soccer players
Melbourne Victory FC (A-League Women) players
Newcastle Jets FC (A-League Women) players
Brisbane Roar FC (A-League Women) players
A-League Women players
USL W-League (1995–2015) players
Women's association football forwards
Los Angeles Strikers players
Expatriate women's soccer players in the United States
Australian expatriate sportspeople in the United States